The Holstein Cup is a Group 3 flat horse race in Germany open to thoroughbreds aged three years or older. It is run at Hamburg-Horn over a distance of 2,000 metres (about 10 furlongs), and it is scheduled to take place each year in July.

The race was first run in 2013, as the Hamburg Trophy, a name previously used for the 1200m race at the same meeting, now known as the Flieger Trophy. It was later run as the Holstein Cup before the current title was adopted in 2018.

Winners

See also
 List of German flat horse races

References 
Racing Post: 

Horse races in Germany
Sport in Hamburg
July sporting events